Tube frame  may refer to:

Tube (structure), a structure designed to act like a three-dimensional hollow tube so to resist lateral loads
Space frame or space structure, a truss-like, lightweight rigid structure constructed from interlocking struts in a geometric pattern
Superleggera, sometimes referred to as a tube-frame structure